Karin Anna-Lena Granhagen (born 7 January 1938) is a Swedish actress and singer. She has appeared in 40 films and television shows since 1958. She starred in the 1969 film Made in Sweden, which won a Silver Bear award at the 19th Berlin International Film Festival.

Selected filmography
 Musik ombord (1958)
 The Lady in Black (1958)
 Mannequin in Red (1958)
 Rider in Blue (1959)
 Heaven and Pancake (1959)
 Summer and Sinners (1960)
 On a Bench in a Park (1960)
 The Cat and the Canary (1961)
 The Lady in White (1962)
 The Cats (1965)
 Stimulantia (1967)
 Hugs and Kisses (1967)
 Made in Sweden (1969)
 Children's Island (1980)
 Love Me! (1986)
 Glasblåsarns barn (1998)

References

External links

1938 births
Living people
Swedish film actresses
Swedish television actresses
20th-century Swedish actresses